Azoarcus communis is a species of bacteria. It is a nitrogen-fixing bacteria. Its cells are yellow-pigmented, straight to curved, gram-negative rods. Its type strain is LMG 5514.

References

Further reading

Whitman, William B., et al., eds. Bergey's manual® of systematic bacteriology. Vol. 2. Springer, 2012.

External links

LPSN
Type strain of Azoarcus communis at BacDive -  the Bacterial Diversity Metadatabase

Rhodocyclaceae
Bacteria described in 1993